John Samuel Kem (born 1963) is a retired United States Army major general who last served as the 51st Commandant of the United States Army War College at Carlisle Barracks from July 28, 2017 to July 30, 2020. He previously served as the 1st provost of the Army University while dual-hatted as the deputy commanding general for education of the United States Army Combined Arms Center and deputy commandant of the United States Army Command and General Staff College. He was promoted to major general on October 3, 2016.

Kem earned his commission through a bachelor's degree in civil engineering from the United States Military Academy in 1985. He also holds a master's degree in
Environmental Engineering and a master's degree in business administration from Northwestern University, the latter from its Kellogg Business School. He is a chartered financial analyst and registered professional engineer in Virginia, where he resides in Annandale as of his retirement.

References

1963 births
Living people
Place of birth missing (living people)
United States Military Academy alumni
Military personnel from Virginia
United States Army Rangers
Robert R. McCormick School of Engineering and Applied Science alumni
Kellogg School of Management alumni
Dwight D. Eisenhower School for National Security and Resource Strategy alumni
United States Army Command and General Staff College alumni
Recipients of the Legion of Merit
United States Army generals
Recipients of the Defense Superior Service Medal
People from Annandale, Virginia